Xerocrassa meda is a species of air-breathing land snail, a pulmonate gastropod mollusk in the family Geomitridae.

Distribution

This species is native to Greece, Italy and Malta.

References

 Porro, C. (1840). Description de deux espèces nouvelles de mollusques d'Europe. Revue Zoologique par la Société Cuvierienne, 3: 106. Paris.
 Bank, R. A.; Neubert, E. (2017). Checklist of the land and freshwater Gastropoda of Europe. Last update: July 16th, 2017

Further reading

meda
Molluscs of Europe
Fauna of Malta
Gastropods described in 1840